Potamojanuarius is a genus of air-breathing land slugs, terrestrial pulmonate gastropod mollusks in the family Veronicellidae, the leatherleaf slugs.

Species
Species within the genus Potamojanuarius include:
 Potamojanuarius lamellatus

References

Veronicellidae